Marion Bartoli was the defending champion, but chose not to participate that year.

Fifth-seeded Virginie Razzano won in the final 4–6, 7–6(9–7), 6–4, against first-seeded Venus Williams.

Seeds

Draw

Finals

Top half

Bottom half

External links
 WTA tournament draws
 ITF tournament draws

Women's Singles